UK miners' strike may refer to:

UK miners' strike (1893)
South Wales miners' strike (1910)
National coal strike of 1912
UK miners' strike (1921)
UK miners' strike (1953)
UK miners' strike (1969), a widespread unofficial strike
UK miners' strike (1972)
UK miners' strike (1974)
UK miners' strike (1984–85), led by Arthur Scargill of the NUM

See also
1926 United Kingdom general strike